Castelnaud-la-Chapelle is a commune in the Dordogne department in Nouvelle-Aquitaine in southwestern France.

The Château de Castelnaud-la-Chapelle is located in the commune.

Geography
The river Céou flows northward through the western part of the commune, then flows into the Dordogne, which forms all of the commune's northern border.

The village is located above the confluence of the two rivers.

Population

See also
Communes of the Dordogne department

References

External links

 English Website of the Château de Castelnaud
 Château de Castelnaud
 Camping de Castelnaud

Communes of Dordogne